Texture gradient is the distortion in size which closer objects have compared to objects farther away. It also involves groups of objects appearing denser as they move farther away. Additionally, it could be explained by noticing a certain amount of detail depending on how close something is, giving a sense of depth perception.
There are three main forms of texture gradient: density, perspective, and distortion of texture elements.

Texture gradient is carefully used in the painting Paris Street, Rainy Day by Gustave Caillebotte.

Texture gradient was used in a study of child psychology in 1976 and studied by Sidney Weinstein in 1957.

In 2000, a paper about the texture gradient equation, wavelets, and shape from texture was released by Maureen Clerc and Stéphane Mallat.

See also
 Texture (visual arts)
 Image gradient
 Perspective distortion

References

Artistic techniques